Wilma Olausson (born 9 April 2001) is a Swedish professional racing cyclist, who currently rides for UCI Women's WorldTeam . In October 2020, she rode in the women's edition of the 2020 Liège–Bastogne–Liège race in Belgium.

References

External links

2001 births
Living people
Swedish female cyclists
Place of birth missing (living people)
21st-century Swedish women